WUAC-LP (103.3 FM) was a radio station licensed to serve Tuscaloosa, Alabama. The station was owned by Crucifest Ministries. It aired a Christian rock format geared mainly toward alternative and rap. The station shared time with WTUS-LP, with WUAC broadcasting from 6:00 PM to 6:00 AM daily, and WTUS broadcasting the remaining twelve hours of each day. A third Tuscaloosa LPFM licensee to this frequency, which would have had a Chinese language Christian format, returned its license to the FCC.

The station was assigned the WUAC-LP call letters by the Federal Communications Commission on November 5, 2004.

WUAC-LP's license was cancelled by the FCC on December 16, 2014, due to the station having been silent for more than twelve months.

References

External links

WUAC-LP service area per the FCC database

UAC-LP
UAC-LP
Tuscaloosa County, Alabama
Defunct radio stations in the United States
Radio stations disestablished in 2014
2014 disestablishments in Alabama
Defunct religious radio stations in the United States
UAC-LP